Hermann Jürgens was a prelate of the Catholic Church. He was born on 8 December 1846 in Münster, in the province of Westphalia (Kingdom of Prussia) and died on 20 September 1916 in Bombay (India).

He was a German Jesuit priest, missionary in India and archbishop of Bombay from 1907 until his death in 1916.

References

1847 births
1916 deaths
German Jesuits
Jesuit missionaries in India
Jesuit bishops
19th-century German Roman Catholic priests
20th-century Roman Catholic archbishops in India
20th-century German Roman Catholic priests